Literaturpreis der Wilhelm und Christine Hirschmann-Stiftung was a Bavarian literary prize.  In 2015, the members of the foundation administration decided not to award any more literary prizes.

Selected winners
2009 Ludwig Fels
2012 Wolf Wondratschek
2014 Thomas Medicus

References

Literary awards of Bavaria